Consciousness is the state or quality of awareness.

Consciousness may also refer to:
Consciousness (Hill book), 2009 book by Christopher S. Hill
Consciousness: How Matter Becomes Imagination, a 2000 book by biologists Gerald Maurice Edelman and Giulio Tononi
Consciousness! (Eric Kloss album), 1970
Consciousness (Pat Martino album), 1974
Consciousness (Smile Empty Soul album), 2009

See also
 Conscious (disambiguation)
 Unconsciousness